McClelland–Grimes Farm is a historic farm located at Morgan Township and Washington Township in Greene County, Pennsylvania. The contributing resources are the brick main house (c. 1873), brick combination ice house / smoke house, timber frame barn (1883), wood frame sheep barn (c. 1890), wood frame wash house (c. 1910), early 20th century corn crib, wood frame scale shed (c. 1940), mid-20th century balloon frame poultry house, poured concrete cistern, and walled spring.  The surrounding farm property is a contributing site.

It was listed on the National Register of Historic Places in 2010.

References 

Farms on the National Register of Historic Places in Pennsylvania
Houses completed in 1873
Houses in Greene County, Pennsylvania
National Register of Historic Places in Greene County, Pennsylvania